Walker Riley Lambiotte (born February 27, 1967) is an American former basketball player. While playing for Central High School in Woodstock, Virginia, he was named a Parade All-American and MVP of the 1985 McDonald's All-American Boys Game after scoring 24 points. Walker played college basketball for North Carolina State for head coach Jim Valvano before he transferred to Northwestern.

Lambiotte was not selected in the 1990 NBA draft and never played basketball professionally.

References

1967 births
Living people
American men's basketball players
Basketball players from Virginia
McDonald's High School All-Americans
NC State Wolfpack men's basketball players
Northwestern Wildcats men's basketball players
Parade High School All-Americans (boys' basketball)
Forwards (basketball)
Guards (basketball)